Just Like a Vacation is a 1999 live album by Blue Rodeo.

Track listing

"Til I Am Myself Again"  – 4:19
"What Am I Doing Here"  – 3:22
"Better Off As We Are"  – 5:00
"Floating"  – 8:11
"After the Rain"  – 6:21
"Fallen from Grace"  – 4:02
"The Ballad of the Dime Store Greaser and the Blonde Mona Lisa"  – 3:15
"It Could Happen to You"  – 5:12
"Girl in Green"  – 7:10
"Try"  – 4:07
"Trust Yourself"  – 6:06
"Dark Angel"  – 5:14
"Cynthia"  – 4:43
"Montreal"  – 4:13
"Piranha Pool"  – 5:11
"Bad Timing"  – 5:11
"5 Days in May"  – 8:19
"Hasn't Hit Me Yet"  – 5:21
"Diamond Mine"  – 10:31
"Falling Down Blue"  – 5:33
"Lost Together"  – 6:16
"Florida"  – 7:16

Chart performance

Certifications

References

Blue Rodeo albums
1999 live albums